2Sum is a floating-point algorithm for computing the exact round-off error in a floating-point addition operation.

2Sum and its variant Fast2Sum were first published by Møller in 1965.
Fast2Sum is often used implicitly in other algorithms such as compensated summation algorithms; Kahan's summation algorithm was published first in 1965, and Fast2Sum was later factored out of it by Dekker in 1971 for double-double arithmetic algorithms.
The names 2Sum and Fast2Sum appear to have been applied retroactively by Shewchuk in 1997.

Algorithm 

The error  is itself a floating-point number.

Inputs floating-point numbers 
Outputs sum  and error 
 
 
 
 
 
 
 return 

Provided the floating-point arithmetic is correctly rounded to nearest (with ties resolved any way), as is the default in IEEE 754, and provided the sum does not overflow and, if it underflows, underflows gradually, it can be proven that 

Outputs sum  and error 
 
 
 
 return 

Even if the conditions are not satisfied, 2Sum and Fast2Sum often provide reasonable approximations to the error so that , which enables algorithms for compensated summation, dot-product, etc., to have low error even if the inputs are not sorted or the rounding mode is unusual.
More complicated variants of 2Sum and Fast2Sum also exist for rounding modes other than round-to-nearest.

See also 
Kahan summation algorithm
Round-off error
Double-double arithmetic

References 

Computer arithmetic
Floating point
Numerical analysis